Richard Hosking Masters (10 July 1927 – 1979) was a Bermudian sailor. He competed in the Dragon event at the 1960 Summer Olympics.

References

External links
 

1927 births
1979 deaths
Bermudian male sailors (sport)
Olympic sailors of Bermuda
Sailors at the 1960 Summer Olympics – Dragon